Chini Mosque is located in Saidpur city of Nilphamari district in Rangpur Division of Bangladesh. The mosque is also known as Glass Mosque. The construction of the mosque was started in 1863 by Haji Bakir Ali Ahmed and was completed within a year as a little prayer house. Later Wazir Ali Ahmed, a descendant of the founders family started the extension and modification work of this mosque. After that, in the middle of the 20th century the sons of the late Wazir Ali Ahmed, Mofizuddin Ahmed and Shafiuddin Ahmed (well known as cloth merchants) continued the beautification work of the mosque. At the time the ceramics pieces were brought from Kolkata as there was no ceramic factory in East Pakistan/Bengal (present Bangladesh).

Architecture and design
Chini Masjid has twenty seven minars of which five are incomplete.

See also
 List of mosques in Bangladesh

References

Mosques in Bangladesh
Mosques completed in 1883